Osage City High School is a public high school in Osage City, Kansas, United States. It is a part of Unified School District 420.

Athletics

Teams
Osage City's athletic teams are nicknamed the Indians and the school's colors are red and white. Osage City teams compete in the following sports:

Football
Golf 
Baseball
Softball
Basketball
Track
Cross country
Volleyball

State championships

Boys basketball
2016 Kansas 3A State Champions

Demographics
88% of the student population at Osage City High School identify as Caucasian, 1% identify as African American, 2% identify as American Indian/Alaskan Native, 0.5% identify as Asian, 3% identify as Hispanic, and 5% identify as multiracial. The student body makeup is 48% male and 52% female.

Notable alumni
Blake Treinen, MLB player for the Los Angeles Dodgers

References

External links
 

Public high schools in Kansas